The Juosta is a river of  Anykščiai district municipality, Utena County and Panevėžys district municipality, Panevėžys County, northeastern Lithuania. It flows for 50.8 kilometres and has a basin area of 273.3 km².

It is a tributary of the Nevėžis.

References
 LIETUVOS RESPUBLIKOS UPIŲ IR TVENKINIŲ KLASIFIKATORIUS (Republic of Lithuania- River and Pond Classifications).  Ministry of Environment (Lithuania). Accessed 2011-11-14.

Rivers of Lithuania
Anykščiai District Municipality